Power is an EP by American "Goblin Metal" band Nekrogoblikon, independently released and produced by Nekrogoblikon themselves in 2013, and was mixed by Matt Hyde.

Reception
Kerrang! Magazine gave Power 5/5 Stars and Kerrang! Magazine (UK) inserted a poster of "John Goblikon" in the August 2013 issue. Power is available on Bandcamp as a digital download and on CD format. A writer for Metal Sucks magazine praised Nekrogoblikon, and wrote an article for the then upcoming release of Power.

Lyrics
As the other albums by Nekrogoblikon, the lyrics are heavily based on topics such as outer space and goblins.

Track listing

Personnel

Nekrogoblikon
 Nicholas "Nicky Von Doom" Calonne – lead vocals, keyboards
 Alex "Goldberg" Alereza – guitars, backing vocals 
 Tim "Timbus" Lyakhovetskiy – guitars, backing vocals
 Aaron "Raptor" Minich – keyboards 
 Brandon "Fingers" Frenzel – bass 
 Eddie "Bready" Trager – drums, xylophone, marimba, glockenspiel, tambourine jingles

Production
 Nekrogoblikon – production
 Matt Hyde – mixing
 Chris Rakestraw – recording
 Aleks Vujovic – album art 
 Nicholas Knudson – chalk art
 Aaron Marsh – album layout

References

2013 EPs
Heavy metal EPs
EPs by American artists
Nekrogoblikon albums